The men's track time trial at the 1968 Summer Olympics in Mexico City, Mexico, was held on 17 October 1968. There were 32 participants from 32 nations, with each nation limited to one cyclist. The event was won by Pierre Trentin of France, the nation's first victory in the men's track time trial since 1948 and third overall (breaking a tie with Italy and Australia for most-ever in the event). In a sport where competitors rarely competed at more than one Games, Trentin was only the second man to win multiple medals in the track time trial. Niels Fredborg's silver medal was Denmark's first medal in the event since Willy Hansen's win in 1928; Fredborg would go on to be the only man to win three medals in the event. Poland earned its first ever medal in the time trial with Janusz Kierzkowski's bronze. Italy's four-Games medal streak in the event ended as Gianni Sartori took fourth.

Background

This was the 10th appearance of the event, which had previously been held in 1896 and every Games since 1928. It would be held every Games until being dropped from the programme after 2004. The returning cyclists from the 1964 Games were bronze medalist Pierre Trentin of France, eighth-place finisher Roger Gibbon of Trinidad and Tobago, and thirteenth-place finisher José Mercado of Mexico. The two-time reigning world champion, and favorite in this race, was Niels Fredborg of Denmark. Gianni Sartori, the amateur world record holder, and Trentin were also significant contenders.

Barbados, Lebanon, the Philippines, Puerto Rico, and South Korea each made their debut in the men's track time trial; East and West Germany competed separately for the first time. France and Great Britain each made their 10th appearance, having competed at every appearance of the event.

Competition format

The event was a time trial on the track, with each cyclist competing separately to attempt to achieve the fastest time. Each cyclist raced one kilometre from a standing start.

Records

The following were the world and Olympic records prior to the competition.

The track was fast, and at altitude, and 17 of the 32 cyclists beat the old Olympic record. The first one to do so was Gianni Sartori (the world record holder), who set a time of 1:04.65. He was immediately followed by Niels Fredborg, who matched Sartori's world record of 1:04.61. That Olympic mark held until rider #24, Pierre Trentin, who broke the world record at 1:03.91.

Schedule

All times are Central Standard Time (UTC-6)

Results

References

Cycling at the 1968 Summer Olympics
Cycling at the Summer Olympics – Men's track time trial
Track cycling at the 1968 Summer Olympics